Neuroligin-3 is a protein that in humans is encoded by the NLGN3 gene.

This gene encodes a member of the neuroligin family of neuronal cell surface proteins. Neuroligins may act as splice site-specific ligands for beta-neurexins and may be involved in the formation and remodeling of central nervous system synapses. Mutations in this gene may be associated with autism spectrum disorders (ASDs). Multiple transcript variants encoding distinct isoforms have been identified for this gene, but their full length sequences have not been determined.

References

Further reading